Vera Papisova (née Papisov; born May 26, 1990) is a Russian-American journalist. Papisova was the first ever digital wellness features editor at Teen Vogue, and covered drug education, gender, identity, mental health, sexual health, sexuality, trauma, and wellness.

Early life and education 
Papisova was born in Russia to father Mikhail Papisov, a research scientist who specializes in molecular bioengineering and cancer drug development, and mother Elena Tokareva, a cardiologist and clinical researcher. Her family emigrated to the United States in 19XX. Papisova grew up in the Boston area. She has a younger sister.

In 2008, Papisova graduated from Winchester High School in Winchester, Massachusetts, where she played doubles on the tennis team, winning the Division 2 state championship and listed as a national champion in the New England region.

In 2013, Papisova graduated from Boston University's College of Communication with a bachelor's degree in journalism.

Career 
While at Boston University, Papisova co-hosted a sex-positive radio show called "Girls’ Night In" with Allie Rosenberg on WTBU and wrote a blog about dating. She also worked at Massachusetts General Hospital, where she was an editor's assistant.

From 2014 to 2016, Papisova worked as a freelance writer. She wrote for Condé Nast's Teen Vogue, covering beauty and sexual health as well as for other publications, including Vice Media. From 2015 to 2016, Papisova wrote for Yahoo! Style.

From 2015 to 2016, Papisova worked as a columnist at Slutever.com, writing the column "Ask a Porn Star." She interviewed male and female porn stars about their experiences with sex and dating, working as a sex worker, and on issues relating to sexual health.

In March 2016 Teen Vogue editor Phillip Picardi hired Papisova for the newly created position of wellness editor, which also reflected the new launch of the wellness sector of Teen Vogue. The wellness vertical is the fastest growing vertical in the history of the Teen Vogue brand and features seven official subsections: health, mental health, fitness, nutrition, relationships, spirituality, and sexual health & identity. Papisova's work has been part of the magazine's shift towards social activism and empowerment since the sector was launched.

Papisova also ran the Teen Vogue sexual assault awareness campaign with the social media hashtag #NotYourFault. Not Your Fault is focused around a series of videos where men and women read about sexual assault and rape. As part of this campaign, Papisova's video series called Guys Read, and featured men reading sexist comments made about women and girls, won an American Society of Magazine Editors award.

In April 2018, Papisova attended three days of the 2018 Coachella Valley Music and Arts Festival in Indio, California to cover a sexual health app that provides verified STD results. During her time at the festival, she interviewed 54 women who had been sexually harassed and sexually assaulted at the festival. Papisova was also sexually harassed and sexually assaulted, saying she was groped 22 times over 10 hours she was at the festival. Papisova published an article about her experience on Teen Vogue.

Papisova documented the aftermath of reporting and coming forward about the experience on social media and, when the article came out, discussing the experience in interviews. She said that it illustrates online harassment and the double-victimization that victims of sexual harassment typically face. Responses ranged from asking what Papisova was wearing to slut shaming to getting rape threats and death threats.

Personal life 
While an undergraduate student at Boston University, Papisova worked in restaurant jobs, which she continued to do after graduating and working as a freelance journalist. After his death in June 2018, Papisova said that Anthony Bourdain had seen a busboy sexually harassing her at her job. Bourdain reported it to Papisova's manager, who had up until that point not addressed the issue.

In 2013, while living in Boston and going to college, Papisova witnessed the 2013 Boston Marathon bombing from a nearby rooftop.

Papisova lives in Brooklyn.

She speaks Russian.

Awards and honors 
 20YY: Planned Parenthood, Maggie Award for Excellence in Youth Media for the sexual assault awareness campaign #NotYourFault
 20YY: Webby Award for the Body Parts series which celebrates body diversity amongst all genders
 20YY: National Institute of Reproductive Health, Champion of Choice
 20YY: Planned Parenthood, Truth Seeker
 2017: American Society of Magazine Editors, Ellies for Video (finalist) for Guys Read video series
 2017: GLAAD, GLAAD Media Award for Outstanding Magazine Coverage
 2018: Shorty Awards, 1st Annual Shorty Social Good Awards – Video (finalist)

Selected works and publications

References

Further reading

External links 
 
 Vera Papisova at Teen Vogue
 Vera Papisova at Slutever.com

1990 births
21st-century American non-fiction writers
American magazine editors
American writers of Russian descent
Boston University College of Communication alumni
Living people
Russian American
Russian emigrants to the United States
American women non-fiction writers
21st-century American women writers
Women magazine editors